The Harraseeket River is a  tidal river in the town of Freeport within the U.S. state of Maine. It forms a northern arm of Casco Bay.

See also
List of rivers of Maine

References

Maine Streamflow Data from the USGS
Maine Watershed Data From Environmental Protection Agency

Rivers of Cumberland County, Maine
Freeport, Maine